GQ is the Indian edition of the American monthly men's magazine called GQ. It is the 15th international edition of GQ and is published by Condé Nast India Pvt. Ltd., a 100% owned subsidiary of Condé Nast International. Condé Nast gained 100% ownership after regulatory changes in 2005 permitted 100% foreign direct investment in non-news and current affairs publications. GQ was the second magazine released in India, after Vogue India, that is 100% foreign owned. Condé Nast India is based in Mumbai and also has an office in New Delhi.

The magazine was launched with the October 2008 issue, which was unveiled by Condé Nast on 29 September 2008.  The cover, shot by Pascal Chevallier, featured Saif Ali Khan and Katarina Ivanovska on the regular cover, and Yuvraj Singh, Lisa Haydon, Arjun Rampal and Ujjwala Raut on the gatefold cover.

Awards 
GQ India gives away a number of Awards in various fields. One popular award is the GQ Men of the year award. There are even other felicitations like the 100 Best Dressed people in India, Creative Personality of the year and Most Influential Men List.

See also 
 List of men's magazines

References

External links
 Official website

2008 establishments in Maharashtra
Men's fashion magazines
Magazines established in 2008
Condé Nast magazines
Mass media in Mumbai
Monthly magazines published in India
GQ (magazine)
Men's magazines published in India
English-language magazines published in India